The Diddy Men are a mythical race whose invention is often attributed to the Liverpudlian comedian  Ken Dodd. However, they have existed in Merseyside mythology for much longer and, along with the Treacle and Jam Butty Mines of Knotty Ash, had been referred to in the earlier act of another Liverpool comedian, Arthur Askey. When Ken Dodd began playing seaside resorts, he made famous his home area of Knotty Ash in Liverpool and popularised a miniature race of people who inhabited it. Diddy is an informal British word for "little".

The Diddy Men were originally an unseen joke but after a while began to appear on stage with Dodd, delighting children in the audience. They also appeared in Dodd's BBC television programmes in the 1960s, as Marionettes. The Diddy Men tend to wear slightly oversized adult clothes in flamboyant style including tall furry hats.

Diddy Men characters
The Diddy Men include: Dicky Mint, Mick the Marmaliser, Stephen "Tich" Doyle, Little Evan, Hamish McDiddy, Nigel Ponsonby-Smallpiece, Nicky Nugget, Ben "Tiny Ween" Winston, Sid Short and Smarty Arty. Diminutive British disc jockey David Hamilton, who appeared regularly on Dodd's BBC shows, acquired the nickname 'Diddy David' which has stayed with him to this day. The original Mick the Marmaliser was the ten-year-old daughter of Little Jimmy, who appeared at the Blackpool Tower Circus with Charlie Cairoli and Paul.
The Jam Butty Mines in Knotty Ash were where the Diddy Men worked.

The Song of the Diddy Men
The Diddy Men have a song, once released as a single, titled "The Song of the Diddy Men", sung in a high pitched, chipmunk style voice. It includes the chorus: "We are the Diddy Men, Doddy's dotty Diddy Men, We are the Diddy Men who come from Knotty Ash". Another song "Doddy's Diddy Party" featured the refrain - "tonight's the night the Diddy Men paint the town, we'll lose our blues, and let our Diddy hair down". There were several other songs including "Diddycombe Fair" - a spoof of the well-known West Country song "Widecombe Fair".

Actors
On stage the Diddy Men are normally played by children or adults with dwarfism. On TV and in some stage performances, Dodd used a ventriloquist's puppet of the Dicky Mint character. These days  the Diddy Men are rarely seen outside pantomime season. Carol Vorderman, of Countdown fame, played a Diddy Man as a child.

References

Fictional dwarves